Pınarlar can refer to the following places in Turkey:

 Pınarlar, Düzce
 Pınarlar, former name of Nimri, Keban, Keban District, Elazığ Province
 Pınarlar, Tavas
 Pınarlar, Tufanbeyli